Simon IV, Count of Saarbrücken, Simon of Saarbrücken-Commercy (born before 1247; dead 1308). He was the Count of Saarbrücken (de) and Seigneur (lord) of Commercy (fr).

Biography
Simon was a son of Simon III? of Commercy (d.c. 1247) and grandson of Gaucher I (fr) (c.1185 - 1244/48), Seigneur of Broyes-Commercy, who was succeeded by Simon III's brother Gaucher II in Commercy, while Hugues, the elder brother of Gaucher I, had Broyes (fr) from their mother Agnès of Broyes (c.1175 - a. 1248). It is not clear if Simon III actually was a Seigneur of Commercy, but at least the title came to his descendants.

Simon's mother was Mathilde (c.1224 - 1276), Countess of Saarbrücken from 1270, daughter of Simon III (c. 1180–1243), Count of Saarbrücken with Lauretta of Upper Lorraine (1195 - a.1226). The County of Saarbrücken was given to the eldest sister Loretta (d.1270), with the others getting a share, but at her death the title went to Mathilde. As a widow Mathilde remarried in c.1248 to Amadeus (fr) (d. 1280), Seigneur (lord) of Montfaucon and had more children.

Simon's sister Laure (d. 1275), married Jean "the old" (1190–1267), Count of Chalon, Sire of Salins, regent of the County of Burgundy, and had several children, including Jean I of Châlon-Arlay.

Simon married twice and founded the House of Saarbrücken-Commercy (fr), having both fiefs as inheritance in 1274.

Marriage and issue
In 1265 Simon married Elisabeth (or Marguerite?) of Broyes-Commercy (1248? - 1303?), daughter or granddaughter of his uncle Gaucher II of Broyes-Commercy (fr) (d. 1308), married to Marguerite of Bellevesvre (c. 1225 - a. 1308). These had two known children, Jeanne-Agnès (c. 1250 - b. 1324) and Marguerite who married Richard of Monnet.

Simon and his wife had one known child:

  (b. 1265 -  1341/42), who succeeded as Count of Saarbrücken. Jean also succeeded Simon as Seigneur of Commercy, already in 1297. 
Simon (d. 1325), married 1309 Margarethe of Savoy (d. 1313), daughter of Louis I of Vaud. Their son was Johann/Jean II (c. 1310 - c. 1380), who succeeded Jean I in 1342, in Saarbrücken and 1326 in the part of Commercy called "Saarbrücken" or "Château bas" (as "Jean IV"), and married Ghislette of Bar (granddaughter of Theobald II, Count of Bar) and had one daughter, Johanna who married John I, Count of Nassau-Weilburg (1309 – 1371), and had several children. Formally she succeeded briefly as Countess of Saarbrücken, and as regent of Nassau-Weilburg.
Jeanne (d. 1375/76), married to Gerhard VII, Herr of Blankenheim (de) (1341 - 1377). 
Marguerite, married to Louis III of Cossonay (fr) (d. 1394), Sire of Bercher, but with no children recorded.
Agnes (d.b. 1337), married to Simon II, Count of Zweibrücken (de) (d. 1311/12). They had two children.
Mahaut/Mathilde, married Johann III, Lord of Lichtenberg (fr) (d.c. 1324). Secondly she married 1334 to Simon I, Count of Salm (de) (d. 1346).
Pierre/Peter
Jean/Johann II of Commercy (fr) (d.b. 1344), Seigneur of the rest of the estate, "Château haut", Sire of Commercy and Venizy. In 1335 he married Alix, (c. 1310 - a. 1358), Dame of Venizy and Brequenay, daughter of Guillaume of Joinville (Briquenay) and Béatrice de Brienne, and had about seven children, including Jean III of Sarrebruck-Commercy (fr) (d.c. 1384).
Jean's second marriage with Marguerite, (d. 1342), Dame of Bosjean, daughter of Eudes V of Grancey rendered childless.

In 1269 Simon remarried, to Mathilde/Mahaut, (d. 1285), daughter of Simon III? of Sexfontaines (d.c. 1238) and Elisabeth of Jonvelle, daughter of Guy III of Jonvelle (d.a. 1175). They had three known children:
 Laure, (b. 1323), married in 1302 to Anseau of Joinville (fr) (1265 - 1343), son of Jean of Joinville (fr) (c. 1224 - 1317), and grandson of Simon, lord of Joinville (fr) (d. 1233) with Beatrix of Auxonne (fr) (1195 - 1261). They had one child: 
Jeanne, Dame of Rimaucourt. She married twice, to Aubert VII of Hangest (fr) (d. 1338), Seigneur of Genlis, having one son that died as a child, and secondly Jean I of Noyers (1323-1361), Count of Joigny (fr). His son Jean II succeeded him. 
 Johanna/Jeanne, (b. 1327), Dame de , married to Jacques of Vaudémont (d. 1299), Seigneur of Blainville and Bettingen, son of Henri I of Vaudémont (fr). Their daughter was:
 Marguerite (d.c. 1344), who married firstly Johann of Salm (de) (d. 1313) and secondly (b. 1319) Guillaume of Vienne, Seigneur of Longwy and Bettingen (d.c. 1344).
 Agnès, (b. 1282 - b. 1349), married to Eberhard I, Herr of Zweibrücken-Bitsch (d.b. 1321), son of Heinrich II (de), Count of Zweibrücken. They had at least:
Simon I/II, of Herr of Zweibrücken-Bitsch [c. 1310 - c. 1355). He married Anna (Agnes) of Lichtenberg (c. 1329? - c. 1377), daughter of Johann ("Hannemann") II of Lichtenberg (fr) (1273? - 1366).

Ancestry

Notes

Counts of Saarbrücken
Year of birth uncertain
13th-century births
1308 deaths
13th-century German nobility
14th-century German nobility
13th-century French nobility
14th-century French nobility